Dallen Ramadhan Rovani Doke (born 2 January 1998) is an Indonesian professional football player who plays for Liga 1 club PSM Makassar. Although he mainly plays as a full-back, he can also play as a centre-back.

Club career

Bali United
On 9 March 2018, Dallen officially signed a two-year contract with Liga 1 club Bali United. He made his professional debut for Bali United in a 4–0 win against PS Sumbawa Barat in 2018 Piala Indonesia. And then made his professional debut in Liga 1 when Bali United got a 2–0 victory against PSM Makassar on 11 July 2018. On 2 December 2019, Bali United won the championship for the first time in their history, becoming the seventh club to win the Liga 1 after second placed Borneo draw to PSM, followed by a win in Semen Padang, giving Bali United a 17-point lead with only four games left.

Persita Tangerang
On 8 January 2020, Dallen officially signed a year contract with Liga 1 club Persita Tangerang. This season was suspended on 27 March 2020 due to the COVID-19 pandemic. The season was abandoned and was declared void on 20 January 2021.

PSM Makassar (loan)
In 2022, Dallen signed a contract with Indonesian Liga 1 club PSM Makassar, on loan from Persita Tangerang. He made his league debut on 8 January 2022 in a match against Madura United at the Ngurah Rai Stadium, Denpasar.

Career statistics

Club

Honours

Club
Bali United
 Liga 1: 2019

References

External links
Dallen Doke at Soccerway

1998 births
Living people
People from Jakarta
Indonesian footballers
Sportspeople from Jakarta
Bali United F.C. players
Persita Tangerang players
PSM Makassar players
Liga 1 (Indonesia) players
Association football defenders